9X or 9-X may also refer to:

9x, or nine times in multiplication
 9X Generation, a Vietnamese term for people born during the 1990s
 Windows 9x, a generation of Microsoft Windows
 9X (TV channel), an Indian Hindi general entertainment channel
 9X Media
New York State Route 9X
Saab 9-X
Saab 9-X Biohybrid
AIM-9X, a model of AIM-9 Sidewinder
Southern Airways Express (IATA code)

See also

X9 (disambiguation)
X (disambiguation)
9 (disambiguation)
 
99X (disambiguation)